David James Ferguson (5 February 1903 – 16 November 1975) was an Australian rules footballer who played with Geelong and North Melbourne in the Victorian Football League (VFL).

Ferguson came from the Western Australian town of Kurrawang and played his early football for Kalgoorlie City in the Goldfields Football Association. As a centre half-forward, he was good enough to be selected to represent the league in exhibition games.

When he joined Geelong in 1924 he began playing as a backman. He was one of the Geelong defenders which kept Gordon Coventry goal-less in the 1925 VFL Grand Final, which they won by 10 points. After missing the semi final, Ferguson had returned to the side at the expense of young Frank Mockridge. In the final moments of the grand final, he beat three Collingwood forwards to take a crucial defensive mark, despite having fallen onto his back. He returned to the Goldfields in 1926 but resumed his VFL career in 1927, firstly at Geelong, then at North Melbourne for the 1931 season.

References

External links
 
 

1903 births
1975 deaths
Australian rules footballers from Western Australia
Geelong Football Club players
Geelong Football Club Premiership players
North Melbourne Football Club players
Kalgoorlie City Football Club players
One-time VFL/AFL Premiership players